The following is a list of compositions by Georg Böhm, a German baroque composer and organist.

Keyboard

Partitas 
Böhm composed partitas on the following hymns: 
 "Ach wie nichtig, ach wie flüchtig"
 "Auf meinen lieben Gott"
 "Aus tiefer Not schrei ich zu dir"
 "Christe der du bist Tag und Licht"
 "Freu dich sehr, o meine Seele"
 "Gelobet seist du, Jesu Christ"
 "Herr Jesu Christ, dich zu uns wend"
 "Jesu du bist allzu schöne"
 "Vater unser im Himmelreich"
 "Wer nur den lieben Gott lässt walten"

Chorale preludes 
Böhm composed chorale preludes on hymns including:
 "Allein Gott in der Höh sei Ehr"
 "Christ lag in Todesbanden" (fantasia)
 "Christ lag in Todesbanden"
 ""
 "" (doubtful; by Buxtehude?)
 "Gelobet seist du, Jesu Christ"
 "Nun bitten wir den Heiligen Geist"
 "Vater unser im Himmelreich" (two versions)
 "Vom Himmel hoch, da komm ich her"

Free works 
 Praeludium in C major
 Praeludium in D minor
 Praeludium in A minor
 Prelude in F major
 Praeludium (Prelude, Fugue, and Postlude) in G minor (& Chaconne in G major)
 11 suites
 C minor
 D major
 D minor
 D minor
 E-flat major (doubtful)
 E-flat major
 F major
 F minor
 F minor
 G major
 A minor
 Capriccio in D major
 Menuet in G major (in Clavierbuchlein, ii, for Anna Magdalena Bach)

Sacred vocal

Cantatas 
 Ach Herr, komme hinab und hilfe meinem Sohne, 5vv, 2 vn, 2 va, bn, bc; W	
 Das Himmelreich ist gleich einem Könige, 5vv, 2 vn, 2 va, bn, bc; W	
 Ich freue mich, 1v, vn, bc, lost
 Jauchzet Gott, alle Land, 5vv, 2 cornetts, 3 trombones, 2 vn, 2 va, bn, bc
 Mein Freund ist mein, 4vv, 2 vn, 2 va, bn, bc
 Nun komm der Heiden Heiland, on "Nun komm, der Heiden Heiland", 5vv, 3 trombones, 2 vn, bn, bc
 Sanctus est Dominus Deus Sabaoth (probably by Friedrich Nicolaus Bruhns), 4vv, 2 vn, bn, bc
 Satanas und sein Getümmel (probably by Friedrich Nicolaus Bruhns), 4vv, 2 ob/(2 vn, 2 va, bn, bc)
 Warum toben die Heiden (doubtful), 4vv, 2 fl, 2 ob, 2 tpt, timp, 2 vn, va, bc
 Wie lieblich sind deine Wohnungen, 4vv, 2 tpt, 2 vn, 2 va, bn, bc

Motets 
 Auf, ihr Völker, danket Gott, 5vv
 Jesus schwebt mir in Gedanken, 4vv, lost
 Jesu, teure Gnadensonne, 4vv, lost
 Nun danket alle Gott, 5vv

Other sacred vocal 
 St. Luke Passion, c1711, lost	
 23 sacred songs in Geistreiche Lieder (H.E. Elmenhorst)...auch in gewissen Abtheilungen geordnet von M. Johann Christoph Jauch (Lüneburg, 3/1700); ed. in DDT, xlv (1911/R)	
 Music for the dedication of the Haus der Barmherzigkeit, Grahl, Lüneburg, 5 Dec 1708, lost
 St. John Passion (formerly attributed to George Frideric Handel)

False attributions 
 Passion nach dem Evang. Johannes (the Passion according to the evangelist John). Previously attributed to Handel and published in volume nine of the Händel-Gesellschaft (1860); attributed to Böhm later, and finally, in 1987, to Christian Ritter.  However, it is currently still thought to have been by Böhm.

References
 McLean, Hugh J. "Böhm, Georg", Grove Music Online, ed. L. Macy (accessed 2006 March 23), grovemusic.com (subscription access).

Bohm, Georg, compositions by